Hrvatski nogometni klub Hajduk Split, an association football club based in Split, was founded in February 1911. For the first nine years of their existence, there was no league football, so matches were arranged on a friendly level, supplemented by cup competitions organised at local and national level except during the World War I. In 1920, Hajduk played in the first championship of Split football subassociation. From 1923, Hajduk participated in first club competition on a national level for clubs from Kingdom of Yugoslavia organized in various cup and league formats. They won two titles, in 1927 and 1929.

After World War II, Hajduk soon established themselves as one of the so-called "Big Four" of Yugoslav football (along with Dinamo Zagreb, Partizan and Red Star), a quartet of teams who dominated in SFR Yugoslavia, by winning three league titles (1950, 1952 and 1955) in first ten years. The following fifteen years were less successful and the only trophy that Hajduk won was their first Yugoslav Cup title in 1967. The final was played at their home stadium Stari plac; it was the only single legged final played outside Belgrade in the history of the cup. The club's most successful period was between 1970 and 1980, during which they won three league titles and five consecutive Yugoslav Cups, all of them but one cup under the guidance of manager Tomislav Ivić. The club also had successful campaigns in the European Cup during this period, reaching the quarter-finals twice, their best result in the club's history. They also reached the semi-finals of the 1972–73 European Cup Winners' Cup, being eliminated by Leeds United. Hajduk were never relegated from top level until leaving the league in 1991 following Croatia's independence. During the Yugoslav era Hajduk won seven league titles and nine Yugoslav Cups. In the Yugoslav era four Hajduk players were top league scorers on five occasions: Frane Matošić in 1949 (who is the best goalscorer in the history of the club), Bernard Vukas in 1955, Petar Nadoveza in 1966 and 1971, and Zlatko Vujović in 1985.

Following the 1990–91 Yugoslav First League, Croatian clubs abandoned the league amid the breakup of Yugoslavia and joined the present-day Croatian football league system as the country declared independence. Hajduk Split were thus founding members of the Prva HNL. In the first four years of the Prva HNL, Hajduk became far more successful than rivals from Zagreb, winning three league titles and two Croatian Cups, as well reaching the Champions League quarter-finals. In the following twenty years Hajduk stood in the shadow of Dinamo Zagreb, winning only three league and four cup titles.

Kingdom of Serbs, Croats and Slovenes/Kingdom of Yugoslavia (1920–1940)

Banovina of Croatia/PR Croatia (1940–1941/1946)

FPR Yugoslavia/SFR Yugoslavia (1946–1991)

Croatia (1992–present)

Notes
 Between the 1988–89 and 1990–91 season drawn games went to penalties with only the shootout winners gaining a point. Figures in brackets in the drawn games column represent points won in such shootouts.
 The 1952 Yugoslav First League was shortened and completed over a period of three and a half months, beginning on 2 March and ending on 22 June. The reason for the changes was a desire to start the next season in the fall of 1952, thus implementing the fall–spring format that had become a norm all across Europe by this time. The clubs were initially divided into two groups of six teams each, where everyone within a given group played each other twice (home and away). After ten rounds Hajduk finished second in their group and qualified for the four-team championship group in the second stage in which four best-placed teams from preliminary groups played each other twice. Eventually Hajduk finished first, one point ahead of Red Star. The statistics for the 1952 season thus show season totals and not just the final standings in the second stage group.
 Although Hajduk won the 1954–55 championship, the Football Association of Yugoslavia sent Hajduk as the champions to the Mitropa Cup, while fifth-placed Partizan was chosen to participate in the inaugural European Cup.
 Tournament was played with five participating countries having 6 teams each playing two-legged ties. The final classification was given only by countries with Yugoslavia finishing second behind Hungary. Hajduk defeated Bologna 3–1 away and 1–0 in Split.
 At the beginning of 1964–65 season, Hajduk Split, Željezničar and Trešnjevka were found guilty of match-fixing back in the 1963–64 season. Their guilt was based on the written statement by Željezničar goalkeeper Ranko Planinić and his testimony erupted in a nationwide scandal that became known as the Planinić Affair. On 27 August 1965, the Yugoslav FA's disciplinary body ruled that Hajduk Split, Željezničar and Trešnjevka are to be relegated to the Yugoslav Second League.  After appeal, the main punishment for the three clubs was reduced to points-deduction and Hajduk received a five-point deduction.
 As the Yugoslav Cup final was moved to November 1973, the cup was held in a single year, so the 1971–72 cup runners-up Dinamo Zagreb entered the 1973–74 European Cup Winners' Cup.
 Hajduk Split were banned from European competitions for two years after crowd trouble during the return leg of the 1987–88 European Cup Winners' Cup second round match against Marseille, which Hajduk won 2–0 but was later awarded 3–0 to Marseille.
 Hajduk Split could not enter European competitions in the following 1992–93 season as the Croatian Football Federation, the league's governing body, wasn't yet recognized by UEFA and officially became its affiliate as late as June 1993.
 Hajduk Split were deducted three points, due to not showing up in the derby match against Dinamo Zagreb in the 16th round.

References

Seasons
 
Hajduk Split
Hajduk Split Seasons